Fistula Foundation is a nonprofit 501(c)(3) organization focused on treatment of obstetric fistula, funding more repair surgeries than any other organization, public or private. As of September 2022, they support hospitals and doctors in over 20 countries across Africa and Asia. The foundation is dedicated to treating obstetric fistula by covering the full cost of fistula repair surgery for poor women who would otherwise not be able to access treatment. They also provide fistula surgeon training, equipment and facility upgrades that make fistula treatment as safe as possible, post-surgery counseling and support for healed patients. The foundation has been recognized by several organizations for its transparency, effectiveness and efficiency, earning a top "A" rating from Charity Watch and a four star rating from Charity Navigator for 16 years in a row, placing it in the top 1% of charities reviewed on the site. The foundation has also been selected as one of 22 charities recommended by Princeton Professor Peter Singer's organization, The Life You Can Save. The organization's cost-effectiveness was also noted by GiveWell in 2019.

History 
Fistula Foundation was founded in 2000 by Richard Haas and his daughter Shaleece Haas, who both left the organization in 2005. It is headquartered in San Jose, California, and has offices in Kenya and Zambia. Since its inception, the organization has raised more than $108.5 million from donors from more than 81 countries. Until 2008, the foundation supported only the work of the Addis Ababa Fistula Hospital in Ethiopia, founded by the late Dr. Catherine Hamlin and her husband Reginald Hamlin. In 2009, the foundation expanded its mission from funding only that hospital to addressing fistula treatment globally. Since then, they have supported projects in a total of 33 countries across Africa and Asia. Since expanding their mission in 2009, they have provided more than 75,000 surgeries.

Focus 
The need for fistula treatment far outstrips supply. For every woman who is treated, there are an estimated 50 more women who go without, according to the foundation and affirmed by a peer reviewed published meta-analysis. Because of this, Fistula Foundation focuses primarily on treatment, either directly through fistula repair surgeries, or by removing barriers to treatment through training of surgeons and the provision and equipping of medical facilities.

Since expanding to a global mission in 2009, the organization has grown to help address the large unmet need. They now provide more support than any other organization including USAID and the United Nations. Countries where the foundation has supported projects include Afghanistan, Angola, Bangladesh, Benin, Burundi, Cameroon, Chad, Democratic Republic of the Congo, Ethiopia, Guinea-Bissau, Guinea, Kenya, Liberia, Madagascar, Mali, Malawi, Mauritania, Mozambique, Nepal, Niger, Nigeria, Pakistan, Rwanda, Senegal, Somalia, Somaliland, Sudan, South Sudan, Tanzania, Uganda, Zambia and Zimbabwe.

The foundation also funds surgeon training, growing the pool of skilled fistula surgeons with the ability to perform what can be a very complex surgery. The organization supported the FIGO (International Federation of Gynaecology and Obstetrics) Fistula Training Initiative, which works to build the capacity of fistula surgeons in accredited training centers using the FIGO Global Competency-Based Fistula Surgery Training Manual.

Leadership 
Fistula Foundation is led by CEO Kate Grant, who joined the organization in 2005 as its first chief executive. Under her leadership, the foundation has grown from supporting one facility in one country to become the global leader in fistula treatment. In 2014, Grant was the recipient of the American Marketing Association Foundation "Nonprofit Marketer of the Year Award". The foundation has a six-member Board of Directors; the chair is Ling Yang Lew.

Ratings 
The foundation meets all Better Business Bureau Standards of Charity Accountability, and is a Top-Rated Charity on GreatNonprofits. In 2015, it was selected by the investment firm The Motley Fool as their holiday 'Foolanthropy' partner, raising over $75,000. ConsumerReports published a list of recommended charities for the 2018 holiday season, naming the Fistula Foundation as one of only five international organizations.

In 2019, the charity evaluator GiveWell said of the foundation: "From an initial cost-effectiveness analysis, our best estimate is that Fistula Foundation may be in the range of cost-effectiveness of our current top charities." GiveWell's evaluation of the organization is ongoing.

Partnerships 
The foundation is a partner of the United Nations Population Fund’s Campaign to End Fistula. Other partners have included Direct Relief, the International Federation of Gynaecology and Obstetrics (FIGO) and the International Society of Obstetric Fistula Surgeons (ISOFS). The foundation was a primary funder of the Global Fistula Treatment Map.

When the organization expanded to fight fistula globally in 2009, its first surgeon partner was Dr. Denis Mukwege of Panzi Hospital in the Democratic Republic of Congo. This partnership has continued ever since, and in 2018, Mukwege was awarded the Nobel Peace Prize. Another notable partner is Edna Adan Ismail, founder of the Edna Adan Hospital and University, former First Lady and Foreign Minister of Somaliland, and the country's first qualified nurse midwife.

Fistula Foundation has received funding and support from Johnson & Johnson. The company has partnered with the foundation for the last decade, providing almost $4 million in support.

In 2014, the foundation launched its first countrywide treatment network in Kenya with seed funding from Astellas Pharma EMEA. The initiative is designed to treat women, train more fistula surgeons, and build a lasting network of treatment providers. The foundation launched a second countrywide treatment network in Zambia in 2017, with the support of Johnson & Johnson. Cumulatively, the networks in Kenya and Zambia have treated more than 7,300 women, added 12 facilities to a nationwide fistula treatment network, certified 14 new fistula surgeons at FIGO global competency level, and held over 28,101 community outreach events designed to educate communities about obstetric fistula, how to identify it and where to receive treatment.

Media 
Two-time Pulitzer Prize-winning journalist Nicholas D. Kristof has consistently covered the foundation's work in his New York Times column, most recently in October 2019.  He first mentioned the organization in June 2005, and again in June 2006, February 2007, October 2009, December 2009, May 2010, May 2011, May 2012, June 2013, February 2014, March 2015, March 2016, and February 2018.

The foundation also continues to generate attention through Grant's articles in international publications including The Guardian, The Lancet, The San Jose Mercury News, Medium, and The Huffington Post. The foundation was also featured in Kenyan television (CitizenTV, NTV) for celebrating the grand opening of the Gynocare Women's & Fistula Center, a hospital funded by Fistula Foundation's donors. Dr. Hillary Mabeya, co-founder of Gynocare, published an op-ed about his work as a fistula surgeon in U.S. News & World Report in May 2018. PBS NewsHour aired a segment on Fistula Foundation's countrywide treatment network in Kenya in December 2017. The organization has also garnered coverage in The Independent, Rolling Stone, USA Today, Reuters, NewsWeek, NewsDeeply, Money Magazine, and MSN News.

The foundation was featured prominently as a top effective charity in the 10th anniversary edition of ethicist professor Peter Singer's book, The Life You Can Save. Singer's partnership with the foundation is longstanding. In 2015, Singer put on a concert with Grammy Award-winning musician Paul Simon, which raised over $150,000 for fistula care.

The foundation was a primary sponsor of the documentary film A Walk to Beautiful which won the Best Feature-Length Documentary of 2007 from the International Documentary Association as well as an Emmy for best long form documentary in 2008. The film tells the story of five Ethiopian women treated by Dr. Hamlin and her staff at the Addis Ababa Fistula Hospital. PBS's NOVA is the other major sponsor of the documentary. In 2016, Comedian Louis C.K. won $50,000 for the Fistula Foundation on the Jeopardy! "Power Players" edition. Fistula Foundation was also featured in Nicholas Kristof and Sheryl WuDunn's book, Half the Sky: Turning Oppression into Opportunity for Women Worldwide. This campaign included a Facebook-based game, Half the Game. Thanks to $250,000 in support from Johnson & Johnson, players of this game can help fund fistula treatment in the real world, through online actions in the game.

Allan Rosenfield Award 

The foundation's Allan Rosenfield Award recognized outstanding contributions of those who have left a deep and accomplished legacy for the foundation and its mission. The award was inaugurated in 2012, and is named for Dr. Allan Rosenfield, who served on the organization's board of directors for five years. As dean of Columbia University's Mailman School of Public Health, Rosenfield was known globally for his pioneering leadership and myriad of contributions to the field of women's health.

In 2016, Conrad Person of Johnson & Johnson was awarded for his key role in forging an enduring partnership between the foundation and its biggest corporate sponsor. In 2017, the late Jerry Goldstein was honored as Fistula Foundation's longest-standing volunteer, dedicating a portion of his time every week since 2005. Several past board members have been presented with the award, including Kelly Brennan, Larry William, Rob Tessler, Jerry Shefren, Kassahun Kebede, Linda Tripp, Teri Whitcraft, Bill Mann and Denis Robson.

References

External links

The Global Library of Women's Medicine: Safer Motherhood Section - Non-profit offering freely downloadable material, including fistula surgery, for healthcare professionals.

Health charities in the United States
Surgical organizations based in the United States
Healthcare in Ethiopia
Organizations based in San Jose, California
Medical and health organizations based in California
Foreign charities operating in Ethiopia
501(c)(3) organizations
Maternal health
2000 establishments in California
Non-profit organizations based in the San Francisco Bay Area